China women's national bandy team is governed by the China Bandy Federation. It made its World Championship debut in the 2016 tournament in Roseville, Minnesota, United States. It lost all matches without scoring. In the 2018 Championship on home ice in Chengde, China beat the newcomers Estonia and Switzerland. China was scheduled to compete in the 2019 women's world championship in Oslo, Norway, but the team had to withdraw due to the COVID pandemic outbreak.

Tournament participation

World Championships

See also
Bandy
Rink bandy
Women's Bandy World Championship
Great Britain women's national bandy team
Sweden women's national bandy team
Russia women's national bandy team
Finland women's national bandy team
Norway women's national bandy team
Switzerland women's national bandy team
United States women's national bandy team
Canada women's national bandy team
Hungary women's national bandy team
Soviet Union women's national bandy team

Sources

External links
Team picture
Team picture again
Picture from the first World Championship match
Picture of the team captain Qiu Jin Xiao
Picture of the team after its first ever World Championship victory, against Estonia

Bandy in China
National bandy teams
Bandy